Caio Felipe dos Santos Silva (born 16 April 1999), commonly known as Caio Felipe, is a Brazilian footballer who currently plays as a defender for Sport Recife.

Career statistics

Club

Notes

References

External links

1999 births
Living people
Brazilian footballers
Association football defenders
Sport Club do Recife players